Jörg Lipinski (born 31 October 1967) is a retired German football midfielder.

References

1967 births
Living people
German footballers
SC Westfalia Herne players
ASC Schöppingen players
Rot-Weiss Essen players
SC Fortuna Köln players
Rot-Weiß Oberhausen players
1. FC Kleve players
TuRU Düsseldorf players
2. Bundesliga players
Association football midfielders
People from Herne, North Rhine-Westphalia
Sportspeople from Arnsberg (region)
Footballers from North Rhine-Westphalia
West German footballers